Auguste Clot (1858–1936) was a French printer based in Paris and known for his lithographic work with artists including Vincent van Gogh, Pierre Bonnard, Paul Cézanne, Auguste Rodin and Edvard Munch.

Clot was born in Paris in 1858. He began his career working for Lemercier, and founded his own atelier in 1893. He often worked with the art dealer and publisher Ambroise Vollard.

Clot died in Villeneuve, St.Georges, Val de Marne in 1936.

References

1858 births
1936 deaths
Printers from Paris